Reginald Faria (born November 1981) is a Dutch retired footballer who played for Dutch Eredivisie Club FC Volendam during 2003-2004 season.

Club career
Faria made his professional debut for Eerste Divisie outfit Volendam on 19 August 2001 against FC Emmen and had spells at Haarlem,  TOP Oss and Omniworld before moving abroad to play for Israeli second tier club Sektzia Ness Ziona.

He left the club in February 2011 claiming they owed him salary and joined Dutch amateurs Huizen, only to leave them two months later after falling out with their manager. He finished his career at amateur side SC Feyenoord in 2016.

References

External links
 Voetbal International Profile
 

1981 births
Living people
Footballers from Amsterdam
Dutch sportspeople of Surinamese descent
Association football forwards
Dutch footballers
FC Volendam players
HFC Haarlem players
TOP Oss players
Almere City FC players
Sektzia Ness Ziona F.C. players
Eredivisie players
SV Huizen players
SC Feyenoord players
Eerste Divisie players
Liga Leumit players
Dutch expatriate footballers
Expatriate footballers in Israel
Dutch expatriate sportspeople in Israel